The Raeti  (spelling variants: Rhaeti, Rheti or Rhaetii) were a confederation of Alpine tribes, whose language and culture was related to those of the Etruscans. Before the Roman conquest, they inhabited present-day Tyrol in Austria, eastern Switzerland and the Alpine regions of northeastern Italy. After the Roman conquest, the province of Raetia was formed, which included parts of present-day Germany south of the Danube.

The etymology of the name Raeti is uncertain. The Roman province of Raetia was named after these people.

Ancient sources characterise the Raeti as Etruscan people who were displaced from the Po valley by the Gauls and took refuge in the valleys of the Alps. But it is likely that they were predominantly indigenous Alpine people. Their language, the so-called Raetian language, was probably related to Etruscan, but may not have derived from it. At least some of the Raeti tribes (those in northeastern Italy) probably continued to speak the Raetian language as late as the 3rd century AD. Others (those in Switzerland) were probably Celtic-speaking by the era of the Roman emperor Augustus (ruled 30 BC – AD 14).

The Raeti were divided into numerous tribes, but only some of these are clearly identified in the ancient sources.

The Raeti tribes, together with those of their Celtic-speaking neighbours to the north, the Vindelici, were subjugated by the Imperial Roman army in 15 BC and their territories annexed to the Roman empire. The Roman province of Raetia et Vindelicia was named after these two peoples. The Raeti tribes quickly became loyal subjects of the empire and contributed disproportionate numbers of recruits to the imperial Roman army's auxiliary corps.

Name etymology 
The origin of the name Raeti is uncertain. It is not even clear if it derives from an endonym (the name that the Raeti used to describe themselves) or from an exonym (a name used by outsiders to describe the Raeti). (Cf. the name "Greeks". This derives from Graeci, a Roman exonym for this people, whose own name for themselves was Hellenes).

The Roman geographer Pliny the Elder, writing in AD 70, suggests that the people were named after "Raetus", their leader at the time of their supposed "expulsion" from the Po Valley. But according to a theory of "eponym-fabrication" this was a commonplace fabrication in the Greco-Roman world and may be discounted. The most famous illustration of this theory is the legend that the City of Rome derives its name from Romulus, its supposed founder, while if Romulus ever existed at all (which most scholars doubt), then it would be far more likely that he derived his own name from an existing place name Roma, rather than vice versa. The same theory would apply to "Raetus".

It has also been suggested that the name Raeti may be connected with Reitia, a major goddess who was revered in northeast Italy and is attested in a number of inscriptions on votive tablets of the Veneti people. One Raetic votive tablet, from the same region, contains the word reithus, which may refer to this deity.

Origins 

The earliest mention of the Raeti in surviving ancient sources is in the Histories of Polybius, written before 146 BC. The Raeti, according to Pliny the Elder, were Etruscans driven into the Alps from the Po Valley by invading Gauls. This account of Raeti origins is supported by the Augustan-era Roman historian Livy. If this historiography is correct, then the displacement from the Po valley would have taken place in the period 600-400 BC, when major migrations of Celtic tribes from Gaul resulted in the Celtisation of that entire region.

But the traditional "migration theory" espoused by classical authors and, until the 1960s, by most modern scholars, is no longer considered the only possible explanation for socio-linguistic change. It is just as likely that the Raeti, if they spoke an Etruscan-like language, were Alpine indigenes who had spoken it as long as, if not longer than, the Etruscans of Etruria - especially if, as most scholars believe, Etruscan represents the pre-Indo-European base language of Italy and the Alps. Alternatively, if the Alpine indigenes previously spoke a language unrelated to Etruscan, they may have adopted Etruscan through processes other than mass immigration e.g. through cultural interchange with the Etruscans of the Po valley, or as a result of "elite-transfer" by an Etruscan elite that acquired political hegemony over the Alpine tribes.

Ethno-linguistic affiliation 

The Raeti are believed by many scholars to have spoken, originally at least, the so-called "Raetian language", an extinct tongue known only from a series of inscriptions, written in a variant of the Etruscan alphabet. This tongue is commonly regarded by most philologists to be related to Etruscan, a non-Indo-European language which is best documented in the central Italian regions of Tuscany, northern Latium and western Umbria, and also in northern Italian regions of Emilia-Romagna and Lombardy. The language has been called "Raetian" by linguists because it is assumed to have been spoken by the Raeti. It is possible, although unlikely, that the language dubbed "Raetian" by modern scholars had, in reality, no connection whatever to the people known to ancient Romans as the "Raeti".

Even if "Raetian" was the ancestral language of the Raeti, there is considerable uncertainty as to how widely "Raetian" was spoken among the tribes by the time of Augustus (ruled 30 BC - AD 14). In the Alpine region as a whole, there is evidence that the non-Celtic elements had, by the time of Augustus, been assimilated by the influx of Celtic tribes and had adopted Celtic speech. According to Livy, the "sound" of the Raeti's original Etruscan tongue (sonum linguae) had become corrupted as a result of inhabiting the Alps. This may indicate that at least some of the tribes lost their ancestral Raetic tongue to Celtic. Celticisation also finds support in the Roman practice of twinning the Raeti with their neighbours to the North, the Vindelici, who are regarded by most historians to have been Celtic- speakers. The territories of the two peoples were combined for administrative purposes from an early stage and eventually, under the emperor Claudius (ruled 41-54), as the province of Raetia et Vindelicia. In addition, a pair of joint Raetorum et Vindelicorum auxiliary cohorts were established under Augustus.

Further support for the hypothesis that the northern Raeti tribes converted to Celtic speech before the Roman imperial era is provided by the distribution of "Raetian" inscriptions. These have been found almost exclusively in northeastern Italy: South Tyrol, Trentino, and the Veneto region. None have been found in Switzerland, the other core Raeti region. The Raetic inscriptions indicate that "Raetian" survived as late as the 3rd century AD, suggesting that the Raeti tribes in this region at least may not have converted to Celtic speech. In addition, the abundance of Celtic toponyms and the complete absence of Etruscan place names in the Rhaetian territory, leads to the conclusion that, by the time of Roman conquest, the Rhaetians were completely Celticized.

During the centuries of Roman rule, the Raeti became predominantly Latin-speakers. It has been suggested that a surviving relic of the Raeti's Latin speech is the Romansh language, one of the so-called "Rhaeto-Romance languages". Romansch survives today in a few valleys of Swiss canton Grisons (most of which is today German-speaking). However, a Raetian origin for Romansch is uncertain, as Rhaeto-Romance languages appear most closely related to the Gallo-Romance group, strengthening the argument that at least some of the Raeti had adopted Celtic speech before Latinisation.

Territory 

The evidence suggests that the original Roman district of Raetia et Vindelicia, as established under Augustus, had as its eastern border (with the province of Noricum) the river Aenus (Inn) from its confluence with the Danube as far South as, and then by the river Isarcus (Eisack). Its northern border with the "free" German tribes was defined by the course of the upper Danube. On the West, Raetia et Vindelicia included the whole of Lake Constance and the upper Rhine valley and then a long tract westwards along the upper Rhone valley as far as Lake Leman. To the South, its border with the Italian regiones (administrative districts) of Gallia Transpadana and Venetia et Histria was roughly similar to the northern border of present-day Italy.

The Vindelici were, according to Ptolemy, confined to the East of the river Licca (Lech), while West of that river, upper Bavaria was inhabited by Raeti. A contrary view is that the whole region between the Danube and the Alps was occupied by Vindelici, with the Raeti confined to the Alps themselves.

The latter view accords with Strabo, who records that the territory occupied by the Raeti tribes stretched from the upper reaches of the river Rhine in northern Switzerland to as far south as the cities of Como and Verona in northern Italy. The Raeti were bounded in the East by the Celtic Taurisci of Noricum and in the West by the Helvetii.

Tribes 
Although the ancient sources concur in ascribing an Etruscan origin to the Raeti, they are less clear as to precisely which tribes attested in the region known as Raetia could be classified as Raeti (and whether such a classification was based on geographical location or language or cultural factors). In addition, there are considerable discrepancies in the names of tribes given by the sources. Some locations of the tribes recorded are uncertain, although most have been established securely by placename and personal-name evidence.

Strabo names the Lepontii, Camunni (who gave their name to the Val Camonica, Lombardy, Italy), Cotuantii and Rucantii as Raeti tribes. Of these, the first two are listed with the same spelling in Augustus' inscription while the latter two are probably the Cosuanetes and the Rucinates respectively in Augustus. However, the inscription text appears to identify the Rucinates as one of the 4 tribes of the Vindelici recorded as conquered. (But it is possible that the Strabo's Rucantii were actually another tribe, the Rugusci, in Augustus).

Against Strabo, Pliny considers the Lepontii as a Celtic tribe akin to the Taurisci and classifies the Camunni as a tribe of the Euganei people of northeast Italy, together with the Trumplini of the neighbouring valley, Val Trompia. However, neither of Pliny's comments is fatal to the identification of the Lepontii and Camunni as Raeti. The Lepontic language has been definitively classified as a distinct Continental Celtic language (e.g. Lejeune 1971, Koch 2008). As for the Euganei, their linguistic classification is uncertain due to scanty evidence. It is possible that their speech was also related to Etruscan, possibly a sub-group of Tyrsenian languages. Alternatively their language may have been Indo-European, akin to that of their close neighbours, the Celts or the Veneti (whose language shares several similarities with Latin and the Italic languages, but also has some affinities with other IE languages, especially Germanic and Celtic). 

In addition, it appears that "Raetia et Vindelicia" was also inhabited by a number of non-Raetic tribes. The Breuni and Genauni are classified as Illyrian by Strabo, while a number of tribes in the region have plausible Celtic etymologies: e.g. Caturiges from catu- ("fight" or "warriors") and Nantuates from nantu- ("valley") respectively.

The Tropaeum Alpium inscription contains the names of 45 Alpine tribes. Taking those that inhabited the territories of Raetia et Vindelicia province and Venetia et Histria regio of N. Italy, and eliminating those tribes considered probably Celtic by scholars (Medulli, Ucenni, Caturiges, Brigiani, Sogionti, Ceutrones, Uberi, Nantuates, Sedunes, Veragri), the following list of possible Raeti tribes results:

Roman conquest 
The Raeti, together with their probably Celtic neighbours to the North, the Vindelici, were subdued by the Roman emperor Augustus' stepsons and senior military commanders Tiberius and Drusus in a two-pronged campaign in 15 BC.

Until ca. AD 100, the region was garrisoned, on its western edge (at Vindonissa from ca. AD 15), by at least one Roman legion (probably legio XIX until AD 9, when it was destroyed in the Battle of the Teutoburg Forest). In addition, Roman auxiliary forces and leves armaturae ("light troops", probably a local militia) were stationed there. But these forces were mainly for security against external threats, not internal unrest. Strabo wrote that the Alpine tribes as a whole adapted easily to Roman rule and had not rebelled in the 33 years that had elapsed since the initial conquest.

The Raeti (and the Vindelici) were obliged to pay taxes to Rome. However, their combined territory was initially organised not as a full Roman province but a military district under a Roman equestrian officer, attested as "praefectus of the Raeti, Vindelici and the Poenine Valley". It was apparently not before emperor Claudius (ruled 41-54), that the district became a full province with the official name of Raetia et Vindelicia (abbreviated to simply Raetia in the later 1st century), while the Poenine Valley (Canton Valais, Switz.) was separated to join the province of Alpes Graiae. Raetia was governed by an equestrian procurator.

According to the epigraphic record, the early Julio-Claudian period of the Roman Empire (30 BC - AD 37) saw the formation of at least 10 auxiliary infantry regiments from the Raeti tribes (the cohortes Raetorum). This represents some 5,000 recruits, an enormous levy from sparsely-populated Alpine valleys. It suggests that the Raeti were strongly attracted to a career in the Roman military. (See Alpine regiments of the Roman army).

See also 
 Alpine regiments of the Roman army
 Raetia
 Raetic language

Notes

References

Ancient 
 Dio Cassius Roman History (ca. 130 AD)
 Livy Ab urbe condita (ca. 20 AD)
 Pliny the Elder Naturalis Historia (ca. 70 AD)
 Polybius The Histories (Polybius) (ca. 160 BC)
 Strabo Geographica (ca. 20 AD)

Modern 
 A. Baruffi, Spirit of Rhaetia: The Call of the Holy Mountains (LiteraryJoint, Philadelphia, PA, 2020), 
 Alfoldy, Geza (1974): Noricum
 Cambridge Ancient History (1996): Vol X, The Augustan Empire
 1911 Encyclopædia Britannica (online)
 Cornell, T. J. (1995): The Beginnings of Rome
 Faliyeyev, Alexander (2007): Dictionary of Continental Celtic Placenames (online)
 Holder, Paul (1980): Studies in the Auxilia of the Roman Army
 
 Ó Hógain, Dáithi (2006) The Celts
 Marchesini, Simona and Roncador, Rosa (2015): Monumanta Linguae Raeticae (https://www.researchgate.net/publication/317717346_Monumenta_Linguae_Raeticae)
 Zavaroni, Adolfo (2001): Le Iscrizioni Retiche ("Raetic Inscriptions") (online)

External links 
 Raetic inscriptions Adolfo Zavaroni

Ancient peoples of Italy
Ancient Switzerland
Historical ethnic groups of Europe
History of Vorarlberg
Tribes conquered by Rome